General elections were held in South Africa on 22 April 1970 to elect members of the 166-seat House of Assembly. Parliament was dissolved on 2 March and the deadline for the submission of candidates was 13 March. 

The elections marked the first time since the formation of South African in 1910 that the House of Assembly would be responsible solely to White South Africans, as the seats for the four MPs elected separately by "qualified" Cape Coloured voters expired in the same year, completing the process of political apartheid. They were also the first elections after the 1969 expulsion of Albert Hertzog and many verkrampte (hardline) representatives from the ruling National Party (NP), who had subsequently formed the Herstigte Nasionale Party (HNP). This realignment marked a new chapter in the political divisions of the country, with the hardline Afrikaner right-wing later forming the Conservative Party in the early 1980s. 

The elections resulted in the NP retained its large majority, reaffirming it as the dominant party for the post-Verwoerd era. Several new representatives were elected, including Chris Heunis, future Acting President and candidate for the NP leadership, and Pik Botha, future Minister of Foreign Affairs (1977–1994). However, the NP lost seats for the first time since the 1948 election, seeing its representation reduced by eight seats. With Hertzog's HNP failing to win a seat, the split in the nationalist vote benefitted the moderate United Party (UP) in several constituencies, invigorating it for perhaps the last time. Helen Suzman, member for Houghton, retained her seat in Johannesburg as the sole representative of the liberal Progressive Party, the last parliament for which she would sit for her caucus alone. Colin Eglin, who became leader of the Progressive Party in 1971, was defeated in the Cape Town seat of Sea Point by only 231 votes.

Results
Eleven members were elected unopposed. Voting in one constituency did not take place, with the National Party winning the subsequent by-election to give it a total of 118 seats.

Aftermath
Pik Botha made his maiden speech in an unusual tone for an NP deputy, demanding that the government sign the UN Declaration of Human Rights. F. W. de Klerk was eventually elected to this parliament in a by-election to the seat for Vereeniging in September 1972, replacing NP member V P Coetzee.

References

General elections in South Africa
South Africa
General
Events associated with apartheid
April 1970 events in Africa